Māra Zālīte (born 18 February 1952 in Krasnoyarsk) is a Latvian writer and cultural worker.

Zālīte's literary works include poetry, essays, plays, drama, prose and librettos. They often deal with historical problems and have symbolic meanings that correspond with mythology and Latvian culture and people. The author's works have been translated in many languages including Russian, English, German, Swedish, Estonian, and French. 

Her first literary works were published in the early 1970s. During the 1980s, Zālīte turned to playwriting, composing librettos for musicals and writing rock operas. Her works have used music by many eminent Latvian artists such as Raimonds Pauls and Jānis Lūsēns.

She has earned many literary prizes and national awards, including the Order of the Three Stars, and is considered one of the greatest Latvian social figures.

Her first prose work – the autobiographical novel “Five fingers” (2013), earned wide recognition from both readers and members of the writing community.

Early life 
Zālīte was born in Krasnoyarsk, Siberia, to where her family had been deported in 1941.

She spent  years of her childhood in Krasnoyarsk, Siberia until the autumn of 1956 when her parents got the permission to return to their homeland of Latvia. She spent the rest of her childhood in Slampes Kalna Ķivuļi. Zālīte studied elementary and secondary school at Slampes' primary school.

Career
Zālīte is a graduate from Murjāņi sports boarding school (1970) and Faculty of Philology of the University of Latvia (1975) (a former State University). Between years 1974 and 1989, Zālīte worked as a technical assistant at the Writers’ Union of Latvia, as a manager of the New Writers’ Studio and as a poetry consultant for the magazine “Liesma”. In 1989, she became chief editor of the publishing house and magazine Karogs, a position she held until 2000, when she became president of the Latvian Authors’ Association (AKKA/LAA) (2000-2008). She has also been a member of the City Council of the Order of the Three Stars (1999-2006), chairman of a State Language Commission (2002–2004) as well as a member of Chapter of Orders (2006-2007).

She is also a trust member of the National Library Board (since 1998), an honorary member of the Academy of Sciences and one of the 14 founders of “Koknese foundation” (since 2005).

Zālīte has been awarded the Three Star Order, Commemorative Medal of Barricades and has received several literary prizes.

Family 
Zālīte has been married to Jānis Ķuzulis since 1979, with whom she has two children – Jānis Ķuzulis and Ilze Ķuzule-Skrastiņa as well as three grandchildren – Krišjānis, Emīlija and Marats. She currently lives in Riga and often stays at her countryside house in Tukums.

Major awards 
Vladimir Mayakovsky Award (1982, Georgia)

Ojārs Vācietis prize (1989)

Aspazija Award (1992)

The Herder Prize (1993, Germany)

The Commemorative Medal for Participants of the Barricades of 1991 (Barikāžu piemiņas medaļa) (2000) for sinigificant involvement in the Barricades of 1991.

Order of the Three Stars (Trīs zvaigžņu ordenis) (08.11.1995.) for involvement in the Barricades.

Cross of Recognition (Atzinības krusts) (12.11.2008) for outstanding merits in social and cultural work, a brilliant creative contribution in Latvian literature and the strengthening of the Latvian language.

The International Baltic Sea Region Jānis Baltvilks Prize in Children's Literature and Book Art prize (2012) for the children tale "Tango un Tūtiņa ciemos" (Tango and Tutina on a visit).

The Annual Latvian Literary Award (2001; 2004; 2014) for collection of plays "Sauciet to par teātri"; play "Zemes nodoklis" and autobiographical novel "Pieci pirksti" (Five fingers).

Style and genre 
At the start of Zālīte's career, during the time of her first significant publication of poem “Balādīte” in the magazine Karogs in 1972; the main ideas in her poetry were about life and youth in the 1970s — looking for the meaning of life, development of personality, values, and overcoming the problems of life.

Alongside with poetry, Zālīte has written drama. In the 1980s, the writer focused more on the philosophical and emotional motifs combining history and modern times as well as referencing ongoing social and political issues, often associated with Latvian culture and mythology. The tragic Latvian fate and nation's longing for freedom is best depicted in the poetry collection “Debesis, debesis” (1988).

Initially, her playwriting developed as a continuation of her poetry. She has written a handful of plays and librettos combining strong individual characters with topics of history, myths and national identity, her most popular one being the libretto for the mythic-symbolic rock opera “The Bearslayer” ("Lāčplēsis") (1987), which became a symbol of the Third Latvian awakening.

At the end of the 20th century, Zālīte's 6th poetry collection “Apkārtne” (1997) pictured a person aware of his surroundings and the problems he faces – freedom, chaos, hope, loss and depression.

In all of the author's literary career, her works have been strongly influenced by her childhood, which is best depicted in her first prose works – the autobiographical novels “Five fingers” (2013) and “Paradīzes putni”(2018) that talk about occupation and childhood spent in the Soviet Union's regime. Readers describe these works as poetic, nostalgic and passionate.

Māra Zālīte has also released some literary works for children.

Published works

Poetry collections

 Vakar zaļajā zālē (All Birds Know This). Riga, Liesma, 1977
 Rīt varbūt (Perhaps Tomorrow). Riga, Liesma, 1979
 Nav vārdam vietas (No Place for Words). Riga, Liesma, 1985
 Debesis, debesis (Heaven, Heaven). Riga, Liesma, 1988
 Apkārtne (The World Around Me). Riga, Preses nams, 1997
 Dzeja (Poetry). Rīga, Atēna, 2003
 Dziesmu rakstā. Riga, Mansards, 2015

Essay collections 

 Brīvības tēla pakājē (At the Foot of the Statue of Freedom). Australia, Australian Latvian Writers' Days and the Latvian Press Association's Australian Branch, 1990
 Kas ticībā sēts (Sowed in Faith). Riga, Rīga, 1997

Novels

 Pieci pirksti (Five fingers). Rīga, Mansards, 2013.
 Paradīzes putni (Birds of Paradise). Rīga, Dienas grāmata, 2018.

Plays

 Pilna Māras istabiņa. Youth Theatre, Riga, 1983
 Tiesa (Trial), written 1982. Dailes Theatre, Riga, 1985
 Dzīvais ūdens (Living Water). Youth Theatre, Riga, 1988
 Eža kažociņš (The Hedgehog’s Prickly Coat). The Theatre of Valmiera, 1993
 Margarēta (Margaret). The New Theatre of Riga, 2001
 Tobāgo! (Tobago!). Dailes Theatre, Riga, 2001
 Zemes nodoklis (All Cats are Human), Dailes Theatre, Riga, 2003
 Še Tev žūpu Bērtulis (Surely not Tippler Bertulis). Ogre stage, Ogre, 2004
 Pērs Gints nav mājās. Dailes Theatre, Riga, 2007
 Lācis. Dailes Theatre, Riga, 2009
 Priekules Ikars. Dailes Theatre, Riga, 2009

Librettos 

 Lāčplēsis (The Bearslayer), 1986/1987
 Meža gulbji (The Wild Swans), 1995
 Putnu opera (Bird’s Opera), 1997
 Kaupēn, mans mīļais! (Kaupen, my dear), 1998
 Indriķa hronika (The Chronicle of Henricus), 1999
 Neglītais pīlēns (The Ugly Duckling), 2000
 Sfinksa, 2000
 Hotel Kristina, 2006
 Leļļu opera, 2008
 Meierovics, 2013

Books for children 

 Deviņpuiku spēks (Boys to the 9th power). Riga, Liesma, 1985
 Mamma un tētis kūrortā (Mama and Papa at a resort). Riga, Dienas Grāmata, 2016
 Tango un Tūtiņa ciemos (Tango and Tutina on a visit). Riga, Liels un mazs, 2017

Other works 

 To mēs nezinām. Sarunas ar Imantu Ziedoni. Riga, Dienas grāmata, 2009

References

External links 
 Official website
 Māra Zālīte on LIAA
 Māra Zālīte at latvianliterature.lv
 Māra Zālīte at gramatas.lv

1952 births
Living people
People from Tukums Municipality
Latvian women writers
Herder Prize recipients